This is a list of English and non-English terms for administrative divisions.

English

Non-English
This is an alphabetical list of native non-English terms for administrative divisions; some, such as arrondissement and okrug, have become English loanwords. Terms in italics are prefixes or suffixes.

See also
 Administrative division
 Census division
 Census-designated place - statistical territorial subdivisions in the United States